Tal Ayela (born May 25, 1989) is an Israeli footballer who plays for Hapoel Kfar Shalem.

References

External links
 

1989 births
Living people
Ethiopian Jews
Ethiopian emigrants to Israel
Citizens of Israel through Law of Return
Jewish Israeli sportspeople
Israeli footballers
Footballers from Bat Yam
Hapoel Tel Aviv F.C. players
Maccabi Ironi Bat Yam F.C. players
Maccabi HaShikma Ramat Hen F.C. players
Beitar Kfar Saba F.C. players
Hapoel Marmorek F.C. players
Maccabi Kiryat Gat F.C. players
Maccabi Netanya F.C. players
Hapoel Kfar Saba F.C. players
Hapoel Ashkelon F.C. players
Hapoel Ra'anana A.F.C. players
Hapoel Ramat Gan F.C. players
Maccabi Yavne F.C. players
Nordia Jerusalem F.C. players
Hapoel Ashdod F.C. players
F.C. Dimona players
Tzeirei Tayibe F.C. players
Maccabi Jaffa F.C. players
Hapoel Kfar Shalem F.C. players
Liga Leumit players
Israeli Premier League players
Association football midfielders